Transmembrane prostate androgen-induced protein is a protein that in humans is encoded by the PMEPA1 gene.

Interactions 

TMEPAI has been shown to interact with NEDD4.

References

Further reading